Professor Mahmoud Behzad (b. 1913 - d. 2007), born in Rasht, the capital city of Gilan province, is known as the father of modern biology in Iran. He wrote more than 100 books in Persian and participated in the authorship of more than 200 books in Iran.

The son of a lapidarist, Behzad completed his initial education in Rasht before pursuing his bachelor's degree at the teachers' training college (Dāneshsarāy-e 'Āli) in Tehran.

He was the founder of Iran Scholarly Books Editing Organization and was fluent in English, French and German. Behzad was known for the books of French science writer Jean Rostand and English naturalist Charles Darwin that he translated.

He worked for more than five years in Alborz High School as vice president and biology teacher.

He died due to stomach cancer in his home in Rasht.

In the last years of his life, Behzad worked in Shargh pharmacy in Rasht where he was ready to answer his fans and former students.

His older son, Prof. Faramarz Behzad, was previously a lecturer of Persian at Otto-Friedrich University in Bamberg, and a lexicographer. His only daughter, Prof. Parichehr Behzad works in the research department of Ludwig Maximilian University of Munich. Behzad's younger son, Hooshang Behzad, lives and works in Shiraz as an architect.

See also
 Alborz High School
 List of Iranian scientists and scholars
 Higher education in Iran

References

External links
 Professor Behzad fansite
 Biography from his site
 Prof. Behzad Passed away - Hamshahri newspaper (Fa)

Iranian biologists
Science writers
People from Rasht
1913 births
2007 deaths
Deaths from stomach cancer
Deaths from cancer in Iran
20th-century biologists